Galsa Buyeo, also rendered as Galsa-guk or Hesi Fuyu, was an ancient kingdom founded by King of Galsa of Eastern Buyeo (Eastern Fuyu) in Manchuria, on the upstream of the Yalu River.

History
First king of Galsa feared that Eastern Buyeo would fall in ruins after the 22 assassination of his older brother Daeso, king of Eastern Buyeo. He moved south to Galsa river with 100 followers. Amnok(鴨淥) valley was the territory of an existing kingdom called the State of Haedu (海頭國) where its king frequently went hunting. Galsa killed this king and set the capital in that very river. The country was originally in good ties with Goguryeo. The country was fairly independent until 68 AD, when King Dodu (都頭) surrendered to Goguryeo and received the respectable bureaucratic position of U-dae (優台), which seems to be the head of his kinship. The country had three kings, and the name of the second king is unknown.

See also 
 Buyeo
 Eastern Buyeo

References

Buyeo
Former countries in Chinese history
Former countries in Korean history
History of Manchuria